A flight simulator is a device that artificially re-creates aircraft flight and various aspects of the flight environment.  Those not for flight training or aircraft development may be referred to as amateur flight simulators.

Flight simulator or flight simulation may also refer to:

 Specific flight simulation programs

 FS1 Flight Simulator, Sublogic, 1980
 Flight Simulation (Psion software), 1982, for ZX81, TS-1000, and ZX Spectrum computers (sold as The Flight Simulator in the US)

 Microsoft Flight Simulator (since 1982, see History of Microsoft Flight Simulator)
 Microsoft Flight Simulator 1.0, 1982
 Microsoft Flight Simulator 2.0, 1984
 Microsoft Flight Simulator (1986 video game)
 Microsoft Flight Simulator 3.0, 1988
 Microsoft Flight Simulator (2020 video game), 2020

 Types of flight simulation software
 Combat flight simulation game, a video game used to simulate military aircraft and their operations
 RC flight simulator, a computer program that allows pilots of radio-controlled aircraft to practice on a computer
 Space flight simulation game, a genre of flight simulator video games that lets players experience space flight

 Other
 Full flight simulator, a term used by National (civil) Aviation Authorities (NAA) for a high technical level of Flight simulator

See also 
 List of free flight simulators
 List of flight simulation games